Dosmoche is a Buddhist festival celebrated in Ladakh, India. It is celebrated in Leh, Likir and Diskit monasteries. It is the last festival of New Year Celebrations, the other one is Losar. The two-day Dosmoche festival is a gazetted holiday for Leh district and Zanskar Sub Division. Dosmoche is also known as the "Festival of Scapegoat" and is one of Ladakh's most popular prayer festivals. This festival is also celebrated to purify the town from evil spirits.

History
Dosmoche was started by the rulers of Ladakh. The festival was started during kingdom of King Lhachen Gongdup/ Lha-chen-Dnos-grub (1295–1320). He  fought two battles with invaders from Nyungti (Kullu of Himachal Pradesh) to inhibit the exterminatory forces of the battles. Sacred mask dances, known as Cham dance, are carried out in the courtyard of the old chapel, below the gates of the Leh Palace. Lamas are drawn from different monasteries from across Ladakh on a rotation basis for this festival.

Celebrations

High pitched sound of gyaling with the periodic sound of the cymbals echoed off the bare rocky slopes with the rhythmic beats of the drum. Monks look attractive in multicoloured robes and various masks, representing various forms of deities including Buddha. They danced to the beats with colorful fluttering surge to ward off evil and welcome universal peace and happiness. Mask dances are an essential part of Tantric tradition of Mahayana Buddhism.

At a one-kilometre stretch  from Moti-Market to the other end of Leh Bazaar,  thousands of stalls are also famous for a two-day long festival. Thousands of people in colourful dresses converge at Leh bazaar for games like tambola, lotteries and shopping.

Schedule
Since Ladakh follows the Tibetan lunar calendar and Dosmoche festival comes on the twenty-eighth and twenty-ninth day of the twelfth month of the Tibetan calendar, every year the festival falls on a different date of the Gregorian calendar.

Gallery

References

Buddhist holidays
February observances
Culture of Ladakh
Observances set by the Tibetan calendar
Public holidays in India
Buddhist festivals in India
New Year celebrations
Tibetan Buddhist festivals
Festivals of Ladakh